is a 1995 Japanese anime television series. The Eto Rangers are based on the twelve animals of the Chinese zodiac.

Summary
The Eto Rangers ride in Space-Time Transmitting Machine Kirinda to repair the Novel Worlds of Mugen. The Eto Rangers are anthropomorphic animals, each representing one of the 12 Chinese zodiac animals (and The Twelve Branches in Buddhism). In Japan, they are known as the Eto animals. The Novel Worlds are stories created by the human imagination, such as old folk tales as well as newer books. These living worlds play out repeatedly, and are necessary for the good of humanity. Princess Aura rules Mugen, which is an island continent hanging over an ocean from the skybound Novel Pole. The Great God Goal gives her power, but she may never leave the small palace island area. Their nemesis is the forgotten Spirit of the Cats, Nyanma (real name, Chocolat), who was excluded from the choice of 12 protectors by being disqualified from the race (in actual legend there are many versions of this story). She seeks her revenge by distorting Novel Worlds with Jyarei Monsters.

When a Jyarei Monster goes to a Novel World they alter the story, turning it into a different version, sometimes a parody of itself. Bakumaru, the Spirit of the Mice, must use the revealing mirror to reveal ("Jyarei Shouran!") the evil spirit once enough clues lead to its identity. Often, the Eto Rangers must play out some of the story to find out who or what it is, sometimes even taking on the role of one of the characters in the tale. After defeating the creature, Kirinda is called when Bakumaru holds up his hand with one of Aura's 12 gems on it and calls out "Daikourin Kirinda!" (Kirinda, Enter!) Kirinda descends from a dimensional slit and purifies the evil spirit with a beam weapon, calling out "Jouka!" (Purification).

Most of the episodes involve up to 5 Eto Rangers, chosen by the computer's roulette member selection, going into Novel Worlds to repair them, but there is another story going on as well. The Jyarei Monsters are commanded by Jyarei O Nyanma, the Queen of Evil-Spirited Monsters, sitting in her throne in the giant shell fortress in the seafloor ravine. Throughout the series, she is watching the progress of the Eto Rangers that foil her plans. She has a grudge toward Aura for a perceived slight years ago. She sends out four cat warriors created from herself as well. It is not until later in the series that the overall story, and the past, begins to be revealed in more detail.

Characters

Eto Rangers
 (Rat)

The Leader and the Spirit of the Mice. Originally had fear of cats but eventually overcame it with the help of Gaō. Has a Jedi-Like Saber which he uses to kill the enemy (received on Momotaro's world in Episode 2) and the Revealing mirror to summon a teammate which is not involved in a mission or to reveal the Jyarei monster. In one mission where he was not included, He gave his mirror to Souffle in case they need to summon him. Has hidden affections for Cream.
 (Ox)

The Spirit of the Bulls. He can turn into a fierce bull at will when he sees anything red or of a red hue. This is derived from the red capes that matadors use at bullfights. 
 (Tiger)

The Spirit of the Tigers. He has a special pair of shades which he uses to turn himself into a giant tiger by putting them on and shouting "Tora Tora Hai!" which means tiger tiger equip but that sounded awkward so creative licensing was exercised to make it "Tiger Tiger Transformation". He also helped Bakumaru overcome his fear of cats. He had a relationship with Chocolat before becoming an Eto Ranger.
 (Rabbit)

The Spirit of the Rabbits. She has a magical carrot-shaped wand that can change hers or her teammate's costumes. One noticeable costume is a bunny-girl uniform. Has a crush on Bakumaru. Being a rabbit, she has good hearing, and can even hear if her teammates are in trouble from far away.
 (Dragon)

The Spirit of the Dragons. He has a white cloud for personal transportation which he can expand for others to travel on as well and can turn into a giant dragon by counting to three in Mandarin and activating his special crystal ball somewhat like a ninja smoke bomb. He is also very intelligent, can command weather in normal or giant dragon form and while a giant dragon he can use his wings to conjure hurricanes and has various breath powers like fire and a purple breath similar to Spyro's convexity breath. He is one of the most powerful among the twelve.
 (Snake)

The Spirit of the Snakes. He has telekinetic capabilities that basically function for the existence of invisible arms, 2 white gloves that serve as his hands and that he can levitate a bit above the ground rather than slither. He is persistent, wise and quite cunning.
 (Horse)

The Spirit of the Horses. Enthusiastic most of the time and often makes comments on youth should or should not be. Armed with a Horse Shoe Boomerang. It's hinted he loves Souffle.
 (Goat)

The Spirit of the Sheep. She has a magical compact that can automatically detect any metallic materials in the area. In one mission where Bakumaru was not included, Bakumaru gave his mirror to her in case they need him. In another mission (that is based on Hans Christian Andersen's The Little Mermaid), she devoted the story and decided not to let the little mermaid (as a human) being dissolved into a seafoam and protect her from harm in any way, although is hard for her to accept the sad ending of the story. Despite a love interest she developed in the third episode, it can be estimated that she has a secret love crush on Pakaracchi.
 (Monkey)

The Spirit of the Monkeys. Fun loving and silly. He's good at imitating voices, climbing around and scratching his enemies. He and Pochiro seldom get along and he lacks any swimming abilities. He owns the Monkey See Monkey Do Voice Recorder.
 (Rooster)

The Spirit of the Chickens. She Has a chicklet timer that in one episode turned her from her chicken form to a more human form, a parallel to the "beautiful swan transformation" story. She has since then stayed that way due to the fact she thought some of the boys were making fun of her form. However certain things like Bakumaru flashing his mirror and Pochiro kicking a soccer ball into her face, have been to temporarily reverted her humanoid face back into her beaked face. Due to Gao's bravery and sacrifice towards her, she developed feelings for him.
 (Dog)

The Spirit of the Dogs. Values honor and is a bit hot-headed at times, this is one thing that causes fights between him and Monk. Armed with a bone-shaped stick which can stretch.
 (Pig)

The youngest member who is sweet and always hungry and the Spirit of the Pigs. Releases a powerful energy burst whenever he cries.

Others

The protective ruler of Mugen. She serves the Great God Goal and speaks for him. She is the mentor of the Eto Rangers. She can send out powerful beams of energy or diffuse light. Nyanma seems to have known her and has something personal against her. Aura shows sadness toward her, even sympathy, which only infuriates Nyanma. (human)

The photojournalist and reporter of Mugen Times. Also a close friend of Princess Aura. He witnessed Chocolat became Nyanma, to which he is being attacked by the latter. He managed to get in touch with Princess Aura and succumbs due to his wounds. His soul was transferred and converted into a giant mechanical pegasus known as Kirinda. (reporter, griffin)

The giant mechanical pegasus which Eto Rangers use as their transport. When the Rangers subdue a Jyarei Monster, Bakumaru summons him to "purify" the monster and revert the Novel World back to its original state. (Ki-Rin mecha)
 (Oversoul of Mugen)

Evil-Spirited Monsters
  (Cat)

The dark cat mistress, she is queen of the Jyarei Monsters. She used to be , the Spirit of the Cats, who was excluded from the choice of 12 protectors by being disqualified from the race. She became Nyanma and seeks revenge by using Jarei Monsters to destroy the Novel Worlds. Nyanma has a grudge against Aura, and wants vengeance for a past offense. As Chocolat, she had a relationship with Gaō before becoming Nyanma.
  (White cat)

  (Black cat)

  (Blue cat)

  (Red cat)

  (Evil God Bagi cat)

Nyanma's master, the true antagonist of the series. Bagi is the Jarei Monsters' leader and manipulated Chocolat into becoming Nyanma, it seeks to obliterate the Novel Worlds. Destroyed by the thirteen animals in the final episode.

Production
The series as chief directed by Kunitoshi Okajima at Shaft. Mayori Sekijima served as series composition writer, with Takeshi Ike and Osamu Totsuka composing the series' music; and Noritaka Suzuki designed the characters for animation. Several episodes were outsourced outside of Shaft: Big Bang handled episodes 3, 7, 15, and 21; Office AO handled episodes 9, 14, 20, 25, 31, 36; San Kikaku handled episodes 11 and 17; and Samtack handled episodes 24, 29, 35.

Episode list

Legacy
In 2020, the Eto Rangers appeared in the Korean mobile RPG Crusaders Quest as part of a collaboration.

Notes

References

External links

1995 anime television series debuts
1995 Japanese television series debuts
1996 Japanese television series endings
Chinese mythology in anime and manga
Comedy anime and manga
Fantasy anime and manga
Shaft (company)
NHK original programming